Barewa College is a college in Zaria, Kaduna State, northern Nigeria. Founded in 1921 by British Governor General Hugh Clifford, it was originally known as Katsina College. It switched its name to Kaduna College in 1938 and to Government College, Zaria in 1949 before settling on Barewa College. It is one of the largest boarding schools in Northern Nigeria and was the most-celebrated post-primary schools there up to the early 1960s. The school is known for the large number of elites from the region who attended and counts among its alumni include Tafawa Balewa who was Prime Minister of Nigeria from 1960 to 1966, four heads of state of Nigeria.

House's
Memorable names of the dormitories include Bello Kagara House, Lugard House, Clifford House, Dan Hausa House, Mallam Smith House, Nagwamatse House, Bienemann House, Mort House and, later, Jafaru House and Suleiman Barau House, which were called New House A and New House B during their construction. These dormitories housed up to a thousand pupils at any one time, in the vast landscape east of Tudun Wadda.

Notable alumni

Notable alumni of Barewa include:

 Ahmadu Bello - Premier of Northern Nigeria
 Abubakar Tafawa Balewa - Prime Minister of Nigeria
 Hassan Katsina - Governor of Northern Nigeria
 Yakubu Gowon - military ruler of Nigeria
 Murtala Mohammed - military ruler of Nigeria
 Shehu Shagari - President of Nigeria
 Umaru Musa Yar'Adua - President of Nigeria
 Ibrahim Dasuki - Sultan of Sokoto
 Sa'adu Abubakar - Sultan of Sokoto
 Shehu Abubakar - Emir of Gombe (1984-2014)
 Mohammed Bello - Chief Justice of Nigeria
Alhaji Yahaya Madawaki of Ilorin, First Northern Region Minister of Health (BOBA No. 54)
Iya Abubakar, mathematician and politician
Abdulkadir Ahmed, governor of the Central Bank
Ibrahim Mahmud Alfa, governor of Kaduna State
Jubril Aminu, professor of cardiology, and former Nigerian Ambassador to the USA
Afakriya Gadzama, director general State Security Service
Adamu Ciroma, governor of the Central Bank of Nigeria
Magaji Muhammed Minister of Interior, Minister of industry and Nigerian ambassador to the kingdom of Saudi arabia
Umaru mutallab Minister of Economic development and banking veteran
Ibrahim Coomassie, inspector general of the Nigerian Police
Umaru Dikko, minister for Transportation
Nasir Ahmad el-Rufai, governor of Kaduna State
Nuhu Ribadu, former Chairman of the Economic and Financial Crimes
Idris Legbo Kutigi, chief justice, Supreme Court of Nigeria
Mohammed Shuwa, first commander of the Nigerian Army's 1st Infantry Division and former Federal Commissioner of Trade
Suleiman Takuma, journalist and politician
Abdulrahman Bello Dambazau, former Chief of Army Staff
Albani Zaria, Islamic scholar
Mazi Nwonwu - Journalist at BBC and Editor-in-chief of Omenana Magazine
Mohammed Tukur Usman - permanent secretary of the Federal Ministry of Works

Gallery

References

External links
 Barewa Old Boys Association (BOBA)
 Legendary Barewa College: Nigerian School That Produced 5 Presidents, 20 Governors and More

Secondary schools in Nigeria
Zaria
Government schools in Nigeria
Schools in Kaduna State